The following is a list of characters from Strike the Blood.

Characters

Main characters

 
Three months prior to the beginning of the story, typical Saikai Private Academy high school student Kojo Akatsuki became the ) vampire, made so by his predecessor, Avrora Florestina who also blocked his memories of the event. When sexually aroused, he suffers nosebleeds and succumbs to a bloodlust eased only by drinking blood — early on, his own. Kojo possesses common vampire traits, such as superhuman strength, speed, reflexes and regeneration, but as a progenitor, he also possesses greater powers, especially the capacity to control  of which he inherited twelve from his predecessor. Each time he preys upon another human, he gains control over a familiar, which do not acknowledge him beforehand.

 
A middle-school  from the ancient , Yukina was sent to 'observe' the Fourth Progenitor with special instructions to eliminate him should she deem him dangerous. To aid her in her duties, she is equipped with a magic halberd or lance named Sekkarou. Taking her role as  overly seriously, she moves into the apartment next to Kojo's and follows him everywhere. Unbeknownst to her or anyone outside the Lion Kings' directors, her actual purpose is apparently to become the Fourth Progenitor's first blood partner and mate. Like many of its members, she was sold to the Lion Kings by her parents. While initially positioning herself exclusively as the observer of a dangerous threat to humanity, she soon begins exhibiting trust and romantic feelings towards Kojo and jealousy towards other women. During their battle against the Lotharingian exorcist Rudolf Eustach, she gives herself to Kojo, enabling him to first gain control of a familiar. In a glimpse into the future, she is presumed married to Kojo and has a daughter from him named Reina.

 
Asagi is Kojo's friend and classmate. She is an impossibly expert programmer and hacker who works part-time for the Itogami Island Management Corporation which administers the city and island; this provides her with access to powerful, hidden systems and information. She has a crush on Kojo but does not act upon it until feelings of jealousy are provoked by Yukina's arrival. Despite knowing that the island is deeply connected to supernatural persons and creatures, she is unaware that her friends are among them until Kojo and Yukina finally reveal the truth to her.

 
A , which specialize in hexes and assassination, in the Lion King Agency, she is Yukina's former roommate and best friend. She wields a transforming sword/bow named Koukarin in its sword form and der Freishütze in its bow form. She is both overprotective of Yukina and androphobic, which gets Kojo off on the wrong foot when they first meet. Forced by circumstances to work closely with Kojo, she warms to him and eventually offers herself, gaining him control of a second familiar. Subsequent to this, she develops romantic feelings towards him. While her regular duties involve investigating international magical crimes, her encounters with Kojo were apparently similarly arranged by the Lion Kings with the same objective in mind as with Yukina.

 
Her appearance is that of a grade school girl. Her typical garb is a black gothic lolita dress and she often carries a black parasol or folding fan. In addition to her duties as a teacher, she performs various security and investigative functions for the island. She becomes the guardian of Astarte and Kanon Kanase, and provider for Nina Adelard. As a witch, her guardian spirit is the  Rheingold.

 
Motoki is secretly a member of the Lion Kings and the proper 'observer' of the Fourth Progenitor and as such, his actions are restricted. He is a classmate and friend to Kojo and Asagi. Knowing her well, he often encourages Asagi to pursue Kojo. He is an ESPer with the ability to manipulate sound waves in myriad ways but is susceptible to crippling headaches when exposed to loud noise. He often augments his abilities with a pair of headphones and occasionally with drugs.

 
Nagisa is Kojo's younger sister and attends the Saikai Academy middle school and is a classmate of Yukina and Kanon. She is gregarious and extraverted and quickly befriends Yukina when she moves in next door. Efforts are made by those close to her to keep her unaware of much of the supernatural activity that surrounds her brother. She was apparently traumatized after a demonic attack four years prior. She unknowingly carries remnants of Avrora who occasionally at critical moments when Nagisa is unconscious near a supernatural event, will possess her body and offer assistance or cryptic advice.

Supporting Characters

Asagi's virtual partner who assists in her hacking missions. He is the avatar of the supercomputers that administrate Itogami Island, but his deeper purpose is obscure.

Asagi's friend who is frequently seen giving love advice to her. Because of her intelligence, Kojo occasionally feels as if she is aware that Kojo is not a human, but she still treats him like a normal person.

A homunculus notable in that she controls a familiar, she arrived on Itogami Island as a servant to Eustach. She currently serves Minamiya as a maid. She typically expresses little emotion, and is not often talkative.

A shy, silver-haired middle-school girl who is Nagisa's friend and classmate and an inveterate collector of feral cats. She is the illegitimate daughter of La Folia's grandfather, and thus her half-aunt and Polifonia's half-sister, and was raised in Japan. She is the subject of Kensei Kanase's Angel Faux (エンジェル･フォウ) experiment.

, 

Also known by his title, Lord Ardeal, he is a vampire and representative of the  who becomes its ambassador to Itogami Island. As a powerful, old vampire with too much free time he is constantly seeking strong enemies to fight and often interjects himself into situations which don’t concern him. Derisively called  by some who know him well; all of his known familiars are serpents.

The previous Fourth Progenitor who passed her powers to Kojo upon her death. A fragment of her soul, whatever that means, persists within Nagisa and occasionally possesses her at crucial moments. She controls the twelfth familiar.

The princess of Aldegyr is a beautiful, silver-haired girl first encountered when pursued by illicit weapons producer Magus Craft during the Angel Faux experiments. Kanon is her half-aunt.

A magical researcher and director of Magus Craft who after adopting his niece Kanon, makes her the centrepiece of the Angel Faux experimentation. Was previously a court mage in Aldegyr. Subsequently conducts research while held by the IIMC.

An alchemist who is Kou's master and some 270 years of age. Her current physical body, while well-proportioned, is doll-sized.

'Black sword shaman' or Rikujin Shinkan with the Taishikyoku, a rival agency to the Lion Kings. She is both an antagonist and ally to Kojo with her own agenda. Her lance, Richel Carre, possesses the ability to manipulate demonic energy.

A young computer expert who likes and admires Asagi but is also eager to compete with her. She calls herself  and drives a pink tank. Her family operates a major industrial firm.

, 

A quiet individual with long braided hair and glasses who often wears a shrine maiden outfit, she attends Saikai Academy and is in an apparent relationship with Motoki. She is often referred to by her unique spell name, Paper Noise.

A  of Lotharingia, he is a powerful fighter and exorcist who comes to Itogami Island to retrieve a religious relic taken from the church. He initially controls Astarte until their defeat by Kojo and Yukina.

An employee of Magus Craft. A vampire, she wields a spear possessing the familiar Jabra.

Therianthrope, employee of Magus Craft and bush pilot

Kojo's childhood friend. She is apparently a member of  but is not very active with the organization.

She is imprisoned behind Itogami Island’s prison barrier. She was a member of the Library. Her guardian spirit is L'Ombre (ル・オンブル).

The sole convict to escape from behind the prison barrier, he is a former Lion King adept and wields Fangzahn, a prototype lance which he stole after his release.

Homunculus alchemist and Nina Adelard's apprentice

Megalomaniacal alchemist who uses Amatsuka Kou to restore his body

Director of the Blue Elysium resort and the demon management company Kusuki-Elysée. A part-time eco-terrorist leader.

Kojo's mother and chief of research at Magna Ataraxia Research’s (MAR) medical department. A magic physician and Hyper Adaptor, her research involves Sybil, the apparent Priestess of Abel.

Apparent daughter of Yukina and Kojo who arrives like a terminator from twenty years in the future to eliminate an artificial magical beast and bring Yukina a more advanced Sekkarou.

Apparent daughter of Asagi and Kojo. She operated the time machine that sent back Reina Akatsuki.

A young girl who Kojo meets at a holiday resort. She is a succubus with a split personality and a great hidden power.

Mother of La Folia and queen of Aldegyr

Father of La Folia and king of Aldegyr

Therianthrope terrorist and irresistible seductress from the North Sea Empire

Grandmother of Kojo and Nagisa and powerful priestess

Father of Kojo and Nagisa, ex-husband of Mimori

Sword shaman with the Lion Kings

War dancer with the Lion Kings

Ibliss is a vampire noble from the Warlord’s Empire who befriends Asagi and Lydianne.

A lieutenant with the JDSF anti-mage regiment as well as a knight of the Sinful God cult.

A lieutenant with the JDSF anti-mage regiment as well as a knight of the Sinful God cult.

A girl who shifts between a human and dragon form, she bonds deeply with Yuiri after being rescued by her.

Behind the scenes leader of the Tartarus Lapse terrorists

Leader of the Tartarus Lapse terrorists, and similarly to Avrora, is connected to Kojo by being a partial seal of his power and the master of his tenth familiar.

A paladiness of Gisella, who was said to be Kojo's observer when they trained together at Onrai Island for half a year.

References

Strike the Blood